General elections were held in Grenada on 13 March 1990. The result was a victory for the National Democratic Congress, which won seven of the 15 seats. Voter turnout was 68.4%.

Results

References

Elections in Grenada
1990 in Grenada
Grenada
March 1990 events in North America